Roccamena is a comune (municipality) in the Metropolitan City of Palermo in the Italian region Sicily, located about  southwest of Palermo.

Roccamena borders the following municipalities: Bisacquino, Contessa Entellina, Corleone, Monreale.

Demographic evolution

References

Municipalities of the Metropolitan City of Palermo